The Ferran Sunyer i Balaguer Prize is a prize in mathematics, first awarded in 1993. It honors the memory of Ferran Sunyer i Balaguer (1912–1967), a self-taught Catalan mathematician who, despite a serious physical disability, was very active in research in classical analysis. This award acknowledges an outstanding mathematical monograph of an expository nature, presenting the latest developments in an active area of mathematics research. The winning monograph is also published in Birkhauser-Verlag's series Progress in Mathematics. It is awarded by the Ferran Sunyer i Balaguer Foundation.

Recipients 
The recipients of the Ferran Sunyer i Balaguer Prize are:

 1993: Alexander Lubotzky
 1994: Klaus Schmidt
 1995: Not awarded
 1996: V. Kumar Murty, M. Ram Murty
 1997: Albrecht Böttcher, Y. I. Karlovich
 1998: Juan J. Morales-Ruiz
 1999: Patrick Dehornoy
 2000: Juan-Pablo Ortega, Tudor Ratiu
 2001: Martin Golubitsky, Ian Stewart
 2002: Alexander Lubotzky, Dan Segal
 2002: André Unterberger
 2003: Fuensanta Andreu-Vaillo, José M. Mazón
 2004: Guy David
 2005: Antonio Ambrosetti, Andrea Malchiodi
 2005: 
 2006: Xiaonan Ma, George Marinescu
 2007: Rosa M. Miró-Roig
 2008: Luis Barreira
 2009: Tim Browning
 2010: Carlo Mantegazza
 2011: Jayce Getz and Mark Goresky
 2012: Angel Cano, Juan Pablo Navarrete, José Seade.
 2013: Xavier Tolsa
 2014: Veronique Fischer, Michael Ruzhansky
 2015: Not awarded
 2016: Vladimir Turaev, Alexis Virelizier
 2017: Antoine Chambert-Loir, Johannes Nicaise, Julien Sebag
 2018: Michael Ruzhansky, Durvudkhan Suragan
 2019: Not awarded
2020: Urtzi Buijs, Giovanni Catino, Yves Félix, Paolo Mastrolia, Aniceto Murillo, Daniel Tanré
2021 Tim Browning
2022 Pascal Auscher, Moritz Egert.

See also

 List of mathematics awards

References

External links 
The Ferran Sunyer i Balaguer Prize (official website)

Mathematics awards